Utriculofera leucogrammus is a moth in the subfamily Arctiinae. It was described by Rothschild in 1916. It is found on the Admiralty Islands to the north of New Guinea in the South Pacific Ocean.

References

Moths described in 1916
Lithosiini